Club Rachad Bernoussi is a Moroccan football club currently playing in the second division. The club was founded in 1961 and is located in the town of Casablanca. They play in the Complexe Bernoussi, and their president is Hicham Chbora.

Current squad
 Modou Joof
 Jean-Michel Joachim
 Mouad Ouzane
 Boubacar Bah
 Khalil Kaddami
 Ilyas El Maliki
 Lee Hwak

Performance in CAF competitions
CAF Confederation Cup: 1 appearance
2008 – First Round

External links
Team profile – Soccerway.com

Football clubs in Morocco
Football clubs in Casablanca
1961 establishments in Morocco
Sports clubs in Morocco